121st meridian may refer to:

121st meridian east, a line of longitude east of the Greenwich Meridian
121st meridian west, a line of longitude west of the Greenwich Meridian